Sarathambal Saravanbavananthatkurukal or better known as Sarathambal was a minority Sri Lankan Tamil woman who was gang raped and killed on 28 December 1999. This became an internationally known incident of the Sri Lankan Civil War.

Incident
According to AHRC report on 28 December 1999, Mrs. Sarathambal Saravanbavananthakurukal, 29, daughter of a local Hindu temple priest was forcibly dragged out from her home, in Pungututheevu, near Jaffna Peninsula, allegedly by Sri Lankan Navy sailors.

According to the Amnesty International her house was situated at about 500 m from the nearest naval base and her father and brother were tied up allegedly by four security officers dressed in black. Her dead body was found on barren land about 100 m away from their home the next day.

After public protest at the village where the incident happened and in Jaffna her body was sent to the capital Colombo for post-mortem by a senior medical officer who indicated that the cause of death was "asphyxia due to gagging; her underpants had been stuffed inside her mouth, and that forcible sexual intercourse had taken place".

According to the pro-LTTE Tamilnet, her funeral was attended by a cross section of Sri Lankan activists from around the nation. Vasudeva Nanayakkara, then Member of Parliament, S.Sivadasan, the then EPDP Parliamentarian, Maheswary Velautham, Attorney-at-Law and the Secretary Of the Forum for Human Dignity and Nimalka Fernando of the Movement for Inter Racial, Justice and Equality delivered funeral orations.

Government investigation
The government under then president Chandrika Kumaratunga ordered an immediate investigation but in mid-March 2000, U.N. Special Rapporteur on Violence against Women Radhika Coomaraswamy, emphasized the lack of government response to allegations of sexual violence by security personnel in Sri Lanka.

Furthermore she noted, that, despite a presidential directive, little effort had been made to investigate the December 1999 gang-rape and murder of Sarathambal Saravanbavananthatkurukal.

Amnesty International also allege that the victim's father and brother were allegedly threatened not to reveal the identity of the four men who came to the house. Also Director of the Sri Lanka Police's Criminal Investigation Department, who had been instructed by the President of Sri Lanka to investigate the rape and murder, 

Amnesty International further mention that the alleged sailors who raped Sarathambal have been transferred from the area to prevent action being taken against them.

The Attorney General’s Department informed the Committee of Inquiry into Undue Arrest and Harassment (CIUAH). in late May 2001 that there will be no prosecution relating to the Sarathambal rape and murder case, as the police report contained no evidence on the offenders.

See also
Sexual violence against Tamils in Sri Lanka
Case of Wijikala Nanthan and Sivamani Sinnathamby Weerakon
Krishanti Kumaraswamy
Ilayathambi Tharsini
Ida Carmelitta
Murugesapillai Koneswary

Notes

References

External links
Carmelitta by Derechos net
Amnesty International Report on Rape in Sri Lanka
Sri Lanka: gang-rape and killing of 29-year-old mother by soldiers
Details of death, inquest and funeral
Sarathambal murder

1970 births
1999 deaths
Gang rape in Sri Lanka
Human rights abuses in Sri Lanka
People murdered in Sri Lanka
Pungudutivu
Sri Lankan Hindus
Sri Lankan murder victims
Sri Lankan Tamil people
1999 murders in Sri Lanka
Violence against women in Sri Lanka